The Oster is a river of Saarland, Germany. It flows into the Blies near Neunkirchen.

Course
The Oster originates in the Saar-Hunsrück Nature Park, a little west-northwest of Oberkirchen. It flows from the Oster spring, southeast of the Füsselberg and northwest of the Mittelberg, in the northern foothills of the Weiselberg.

Initially, the Oster, flows along the Ostertal Railway from Fürth east to Oberkirchen and then south through the place where it the Oberkirchen Talbrücke crosses. From then on the stream continues in this direction to Hoof and then along the B420 via Marth and Niederkirchen to Werschweiler, where it leaves the Saar-Hunsrück Nature Park. It then flows through Dörrenbach and Fürth to Hangard.

History
After being straightened over long stretches in the 1930s, 60s, and 70s, the Oster has been renaturalized piecemeal since 1990. In 1934 the Ostertal Railway, named for the stream, was constructed along its course.

See also
List of rivers of Saarland

Rivers of Saarland
Rivers of Germany